Balmazújváros is a district in north-western part of Hajdú-Bihar County. Balmazújváros is also the name of the town where the district seat is found. The district is located in the Northern Great Plain Statistical Region. This district is a part of Hajdúság historical and geographical region.

Geography 
Balmazújváros District borders with Mezőcsát District (Borsod-Abaúj-Zemplén County) and Hajdúnánás District to the north, Hajdúböszörmény District and Debrecen District to the east, Hajdúszoboszló District to the south, Tiszafüred District (Jász-Nagykun-Szolnok County) to the west. The number of the inhabited places in Balmazújváros District is 5.

Municipalities 
The district has 2 towns, 1 large village and 2 villages.
(ordered by population, as of 1 January 2012)

The bolded municipalities are cities, italics municipality is large village.

Demographics

In 2011, it had a population of 30,191 and the population density was 36/km².

Ethnicity
Besides the Hungarian majority, the main minorities are the Roma (approx. 2,000) and German (200).

Total population (2011 census): 30,191
Ethnic groups (2011 census): Identified themselves: 28,278 persons:
Hungarians: 25,928 (91.69%)
Gypsies: 1,976 (6.99%)
Others and indefinable: 374 (1.32%)
Approx. 2,000 persons in Balmazújváros District did not declare their ethnic group at the 2011 census.

Religion
Religious adherence in the county according to 2011 census:

Reformed – 5,562;
Catholic – 4,839 (Roman Catholic – 4,674; Greek Catholic – 164);
other religions – 424; 
Non-religious – 11,484; 
Atheism – 393;
Undeclared – 7,489.

Gallery

See also
List of cities and towns of Hungary

References

External links
 Postal codes of the Balmazújváros District

Districts in Hajdú-Bihar County